Robert Cabal (born Harold Christopher McColgan; April 7, 1917 – May 11, 2004) was an American film and television actor. He was a regular cast member of Rawhide.

Selected filmography

Selected Television

References

External links

1917 births
2004 deaths
American male film actors
American male television actors
Male actors from Los Angeles
20th-century American male actors
Western (genre) television actors